Dunham Massey is a civil parish in the Metropolitan Borough of Trafford, Greater Manchester, England.  It contains 48 listed buildings that are recorded in the National Heritage List for England.  Of these, three are listed at Grade I, the highest of the three grades, one is at Grade II*, the middle grade, and the others are at Grade II, the lowest grade.

The major building in the parish is Dunham Massey Hall; the hall, many structures associated with it, and buildings in its adjacent park are listed.  The rest of the parish is mainly rural, and contains the settlements of Dunham Town, Sinderland Green, and Dunham Woodhouses.  Most of the listed buildings outside Dunham Massey Park and Gardens are houses and cottages, farmhouses and farm buildings.  The Bridgewater Canal passes through the parish and a bridge and an aqueduct associated with it are listed.  The other listed buildings include another bridge, an obelisk, a former school, a former water-powered mill, and a war memorial.


Key

Buildings

References

Citations

Sources

Lists of listed buildings in Greater Manchester